Pablo José López Serra (born March 7, 1996) is a Venezuelan professional baseball pitcher for the Minnesota Twins of Major League Baseball (MLB). He made his MLB debut in 2018 with the Miami Marlins. In the 2023 offseason, he was traded to the Twins.

Early life
López was raised in Venezuela by his father, Danny, and his mother, Agnedis, both of whom were doctors. López graduated high school at age 16, where he became fluent in English, Italian and Portuguese, and was then accepted into medical school. Around the same time, he received a contract offer from the Seattle Mariners. He chose to pursue baseball instead of a medical career, to mixed reactions from his family.

Career

Seattle Mariners
López signed with the Seattle Mariners as an international free agent in July 2012. He made his professional debut in 2013 with the VSL Mariners and spent the whole season there, going 7–1 with a 2.57 ERA in 12 starts. He missed all of 2014 after undergoing Tommy John surgery. He returned in 2015 with the AZL Mariners, going 2–1 with a 3.13 ERA in  innings pitched. He spent 2016 with the Clinton LumberKings where was compiled a 7–1 record, 2.13 ERA, and 0.91 WHIP in 17 games (13 starts), and he began 2017 with the Modesto Nuts.

Miami Marlins
On July 20, 2017, the Mariners traded López, along with Brayan Hernandez, Brandon Miller and Lukas Schiraldi to the Miami Marlins for David Phelps. Miami assigned him to the Jupiter Hammerheads where he finished the season. In 27 games (24 starts) between the two teams, he was 5–11 with a 4.15 ERA and a .271 batting average against.

The Marlins added López to their 40-man roster after the 2017 season. He began 2018 with the Jacksonville Jumbo Shrimp and was promoted to the New Orleans Baby Cakes in early June.

López was promoted to the major leagues on June 30, 2018, and he made his MLB debut that same day as the starting pitcher at Marlins Park versus the New York Mets. He pitched six innings in which he gave up two runs on six hits while walking one and striking out five, earning the win as Miami defeated the Mets 5–2.

In June 2019, López suffered a mild right shoulder strain that led to a two-month stint on the injured list. Overall that season, he was 5–8 with a 5.09 ERA in 21 starts.

In the pandemic-shortened 2020 season, López was 6–4 with a 3.61 ERA in eleven starts and struck out 59 batters in  innings.

On July 11, 2021, in a game against the Atlanta Braves, López set a Major League record by striking out the first nine batters of the game. López struck out Ehire Adrianza, Freddie Freeman, Ozzie Albies, Austin Riley, Orlando Arcia, Dansby Swanson, Guillermo Heredia, Kevan Smith, and Ian Anderson on 35 pitches during the first, second, and third innings. He finished the 2021 season with a 5–5 record, a 3.07 ERA and 115 strikeouts in  innings over 20 starts.

López's salary for the 2022 season was decided via the arbitration process; he had asked for $3 million, and received $2.45 million.

On January 13, 2023, López agreed to a one-year, $5.45 million contract with the Marlins, avoiding salary arbitration.

Minnesota Twins
On January 20, 2023, the Marlins traded López, José Salas, and Byron Chourio to the Minnesota Twins for Luis Arráez.

Pitching style 
He uses both a four-seam fastball and sinker. His secondary pitches are the changeup that averages  and a curveball that averages .

References

External links

1996 births
Living people
Major League Baseball players from Venezuela
Venezuelan expatriate baseball players in the United States
Major League Baseball pitchers
Miami Marlins players
Venezuelan Summer League Mariners players
Arizona League Mariners players
Clinton LumberKings players
Modesto Nuts players
Jupiter Hammerheads players
Jacksonville Jumbo Shrimp players
New Orleans Baby Cakes players
People from Cabimas
2023 World Baseball Classic players